List of Earth flybys is a list of cases where spacecraft incidentally performed Earth flybys, typically for a gravity assist to another body.

See also
 List of Solar System probes
 Gravity assist
 Planetary flyby
 Mars flyby

References

Flybys
Flyby
Flybys
Articles containing video clips